The National First Responders Organization (NFRO) is an organization consisting of first responders in the United States. The organization was formed in 2006.

History 
Formed in 2006 and began accepting memberships in June 2009, it claims a rapidly growing membership.

The national organization has two offices: the headquarters in Washington, D.C., and the membership processing center in Melville, N.Y.


Membership
The NFRO constitution and bylaws provide that active membership is open to "any regularly appointed or elected and full-time employed or volunteer first responder, or any agency may be eligible for membership."

See also
Certified first responder

References

External links
Official website
National First Responders Organization Foundation

2006 establishments in Washington, D.C.
Emergency medical responders
Organizations established in 2006
Medical and health organizations based in Washington, D.C.
Emergency medicine organisations